Marcelo Muniagurria (1946/1947 – 11 May 2019) was an Argentine politician.

References

1940s births
2019 deaths
Argentine politicians
Vice Governors of Santa Fe Province